James Hollister is an American historian, ranger and lead interpreter for the National Park Service (NPS). He has been a ranger at Minute Man National Historical Park since 2002. In 2022, he was awarded the Robert Gross Award by Concord Museum in recognition of his service to the town's history and to the NPS.

In 2007, while he was an educational coordinator at Minute Man, he contributed to Honored Places, the National Park Service teacher's guide to the American Revolution.

Personal life 
In 2009, Hollister, who is from Littleton, Massachusetts, was in a relationship with fellow park ranger Emily Murphy.

References 

Minute Man National Historical Park
20th-century American historians
21st-century American historians
National Park Service personnel
Historians from Massachusetts
People from Littleton, Massachusetts
Year of birth missing (living people)
Living people